Hans Kippenberger (15 January 1898 – 3 October 1937) was a German politician (KPD). Between 1928 and 1933 he sat as a member of the National Parliament (Reichstag).

Like many Communist Party members at the time, he also operated under "party names", by which he may be identified in sources.   These included "A. Neuberg", "Leo Wolf" and "Ernst Wolf".

Early life
Hans Kippenberger was born in Leipzig.   His father was a secular preacher. He attended school up to the middle level, and then became an intern at a printing machine factory, still in Leipzig, shortly afterwards embarking on a traineeship for bank work.   

In 1915, Kippenberger he volunteered for military service, and spent the rest of the First World War in the Imperial German Army. He served on the Western Front, was wounded several times, and was decorated with the Iron Cross First Class. When Kippenberger was discharged in January 1919, he had reached the rank of Oberleutnant. 

Early in 1919 he embarked on a commercial traineeship which led to a clerical job in Leipzig.   From June 1921 he was based in Hamburg, employed as a foreign languages correspondent for various firms, and working with the English, French, Italian and Spanish languages.

Radicalization
Kippenberger had already, in Leipzig, joined the Independent Social Democratic Party ("Unabhängige Sozialdemokratische Partei Deutschlands" / USPD), and when this broke apart he was part of the Pro-Soviet faction that joined with the newly formed Communist Party. By 1922 he was employed full-time by the Party and part of what one source identifies as the Party's "secret apparatus".

Meanwhile, he attended lectures at the University of Hamburg on socioeconomics ("Volkswirtschaft") although it is not clear that he was formally enrolled as a student at the university.

He became a leader in the Communist Party student group and played a leading role in the Hamburg uprising which erupted in October 1923.   In the city's politically left-wing Barmbek quarter Kippenberger led a fighting group of workers, also managing to plant Communist moles into Hamburg police and Reichswehr units.

It was thanks to his careful oversight and military training that the communist fighter groups were able to retreat in good order. Despite being elected to the regional Hamburg Parliament in 1924, after the Hamburg uprising the public prosecutor of Hamburg issued a warrant for Kippenberger's arrest.  Badly wounded, for several months he lived illegally (unregistered with the local city hall) in Leipzig till March 1924 when Kippenberger fled to the Soviet Union. 

While living in Moscow, Kippenberger was personally recruited by General Yan Karlovich Berzin into the Soviet military intelligence service, or GRU. After the Weimar Republic amnestied those who had taken part in the Hamburg Uprising, Kippenberger returned to Germany, where he became, according to John Koehler, "the most important link between the Soviet secret service and Germany's Communist Party, functioning at various times under the code names Alex, Adam, and Wolf."

Sources differ over whether he returned from the Soviet Union at the end of 1924 and then lived illegally (unregistered) in Germany or stayed in the Soviet Union till 1926 (or beyond). There is also a suggestion that in Moscow, as well attending a military academy, he studied at the "Communist University of National Minorities in the West". During 1924/25 he was still being sought - apparently without success - by the Hamburg police in connection with the part he had played in the Hamburg uprising.

Red Stormtroopers
Towards the end of the 1920s, Kippenberger was ordered by the Comintern to create a secret paramilitary wing for the party. In response, Kippenberger created the Parteiselbstschutz, or "Party Self Defense Unit."

According to John Koehler, "World War I veterans taught the novices how to handle pistols, rifles, machine guns, and hand grenades. This clandestine training was conducted in the sparsely populated, pastoral countryside surrounding Berlin."

According to John Koehler, members of the Parteiselbstschutz "served as bouncers at Party meetings and specialized in cracking heads during street battles with political enemies." Besides the ruling SPD and it's paramilitary Reichsbanner units, the arch-enemies of the Parteiselbstschutz were the Stahlhelm, which was the armed wing of the Monarchist German National People's Party (DVNP), Trotskyites, and "radical nationalist parties." 

According to Koehler, the KPD's Selbstschutz men "always carried a Stahlrute, two steel springs that telescoped into a tube seven inches long, which when extended became a deadly, fourteen-inch weapon. Not to be outdone by the Nazis, these street-fighters were often armed with pistols as well."

Representative
In May 1928 he stood for membership of the Reichstag in the general election. He was successful, despite being arrested during the election campaign.   As an elected member of the Reichstag he enjoyed certain immunities, and once the election result became known he had to be released. He sat as a communist party member for electoral district 29 (Leipzig).

At the twelfth Party conference, held in 1929 in the central Wedding district of Berlin, Kippenberg was accepted as a candidate for party Central Committee membership. In the Reichstag his focus was on defence matters:  he was a member of the parliamentary military commission.   He continued to sit in the Reichstag till 1933.   Outside the chamber he built up the so-called "Betriebsberichterstattung (BB-Ressort)", originated in 1927 within the party's illegal military apparatus, but from 1932 consciously separated from it.   It was a quasi-military body comprising approximately 300 members who undertook economic-espionage tasks on behalf of the Soviet Union, also reporting back on social, political and economic developments more generally during what was a period of rising tension inside Germany. Seen from the perspective of the Nazi Party the "BB-Ressort" was "the German Communist Party's most dangerous structure".

The Bülowplatz Murders

Planning

During the last days of the Weimar Republic, the KPD had a policy of assassinating two Berlin police officers in retaliation for every KPD member killed by the police.

On 2 August 1931, KPD Members of the Reichstag Kippenberger and Heinz Neumann received a dressing down from Walter Ulbricht, the Party's leader in the Berlin-Brandenburg region. Enraged by police interference and by Neumann and Kippenberger's failure to follow the policy, Ulbricht snarled, "At home in Saxony we would have done something about the police a long time ago. Here in Berlin we will not fool around much longer. Soon we will hit the police in the head."

Enraged by Ulbricht's words, Kippenberger and Neumann decided to assassinate Paul Anlauf, the forty-two-year-old Captain of the Berlin Police's Seventh Precinct. Captain Anlauf, a widower with three daughters, had been nicknamed Schweinebacke, or "Pig Face" by the KPD. 

According to John Koehler, "Of all the policemen in strife-torn Berlin, the reds hated Anlauf the most. His precinct included the area around KPD headquarters, which made it the most dangerous in the city. The captain almost always led the riot squads that broke up illegal rallies of the Communist Party."

On the morning of Sunday 9 August 1931, Kippenberger and Neumann gave a last briefing to the hit-team in a room at the Lassant beer hall. Parteiselbstschutz members Erich Mielke and Erich Ziemer were selected as the shooters. During the meeting, Max Matern gave a Luger pistol to fellow lookout Max Thunert and said, "Now we're getting serious... We're going to give Schweinebacke something to remember us by."

Kippenberger then asked Mielke and Ziemer, "Are you sure that you are ready to shoot Schweinebacke?" Mielke responded that he had seen Captain Anlauf many times during police searches of Party Headquarters. Kippenberger then instructed them to wait at a nearby beer hall which would permit them to overlook the entire Bülow-Platz. He further reminded them that Captain Anlauf was accompanied everywhere by Senior Sergeant Max Willig, whom the KPD had nicknamed, Hussar.

Kippenberger concluded, "When you spot Schweinebacke and Hussar, you take care of them." Mielke and Ziemer were informed that, after the assassinations were completed, a diversion would assist in their escape. They were then to return to their homes and await further instructions.

That evening, Captain Anlauf was lured to Bülow-Platz by a violent rally demanding the dissolution of the Prussian Parliament. 

According to John Koehler, "As was often the case when it came to battling the dominant SPD, the KPD and the Nazis had combined forces during the pre-plebiscite campaign. At one point in this particular campaign, Nazi propaganda chief Joseph Goebbels even shared a speaker's platform with KPD agitator Walter Ulbricht. Both parties wanted the parliament dissolved because they were hoping that new elections would oust the SPD, the sworn enemy of all radicals. That fact explained why the atmosphere was particularly volatile this Sunday."

Murder at the Babylon Cinema

At eight o'clock that evening, Mielke and Ziemer waited in a doorway as Captain Anlauf, Sergeant Willig, and Captain Franz Lenck walked toward the Babylon Cinema, which was located at the corner of Bülowplatz and Kaiser-Wilhelm-Straße. As they reached the door of the movie house, the policemen heard someone scream, "Schweinebacke!"

As Captain Anlauf turned toward the sound, Mielke and Ziemer opened fire at point blank range. Sergeant Willig was wounded in the left arm and the stomach. However, he managed to draw his Luger pistol and fired a full magazine at the assailants. Captain Franz Lenck was shot in the chest and fell dead in front of the entrance. Willig crawled over and cradled the head of Captain Anlauf, who had taken two bullets in the neck. As his life drained away, the Captain gasped, "Wiedersehen... Gruss..." ("So Long... Goodbye...").

Meanwhile, Mielke and Ziemer made their escape by running into the theater and out an emergency exit. They tossed their pistols over a fence, where they were later found by Homicide Detectives from the elite Mordkommission. Mielke and Ziemer then returned to their homes.

According to Koehler, "Back at Bülowplatz, the killings had triggered a major police action. At least a thousand officers poured into the square, and a bloody street battle ensued. Rocks and bricks were hurled from the rooftops. Communist gunmen fired indiscriminately from the roofs of surrounding apartment houses. As darkness fell, police searchlights illuminated the buildings. Using megaphones, officers shouted, 'Clear the streets! Move away from the windows! We are returning fire!' By now the rabble had fled the square, but shooting continued as riot squads combed the tenements, arresting hundreds of residents suspected of having fired weapons. The battle lasted until one o'clock the next morning. In addition to the two police officers, the casualties included one Communist who died of a gunshot wound and seventeen others who were seriously wounded."

Captain Anlauf's wife had died three weeks earlier of kidney failure. The KPD's murder of Captain Anlauf thus left their three daughters as orphans. The Captain's oldest daughter was forced to drastically rush her planned wedding to keep her sisters from being put in an orphanage. Captain Franz Lenck was survived by his wife. Senior Sergeant Max Willig was hospitalized for fourteen weeks, but made a full recovery and returned to active duty. In recognition for Willig's courage, the Berlin Police promoted him to Lieutenant.

After the murders, the act was celebrated at the Lichtenberger Hof, a favorite beer hall of the Rotfrontkämpferbund, where Mielke boasted: "Today we celebrate a job that I pulled!"

Aftermath
According to John Koehler, "Kippenberger was alarmed when word reached him that Sergeant Willig had survived the shooting. Not knowing whether the sergeant could talk and identify the attackers, Kippenberger was taking no chances. He directed a runner to summon Mielke and Ziemer to his apartment at 74 Bellermannstrasse, only a few minutes walk from where the two lived. When the assassins arrived, Kippenberger told them the news and ordered them to leave Berlin at once. The parliamentarian's wife Thea, an unemployed schoolteacher and as staunch a Communist Party member as her husband, shepherded the young murderers to the Belgian border. Agents of the Communist International (Comintern) in the port city of Antwerp supplied them with money and forged passports. Aboard a merchant ship, they sailed for Leningrad. When their ship docked, they were met by another Comintern representative, who escorted them to Moscow."

Nazi Germany
The political backdrop was transformed with the Nazi power seizure in January 1933.   The new government lost little time in transforming Germany into a one-party dictatorship.  Hans Kippenberger was one of those who participated in the (illegal) meeting of the party central committee held at the Ziegenhals café ("Sporthaus Ziegenhals") a short distance outside Berlin on 7 February 1933.   The meeting would subsequently be celebrated as both the first and last meeting of the Communist Party Central Committee held in Nazi Germany. 

The Reichstag fire at the end of February 1933 was immediately blamed on the KPD, and before the end of the year participants in the Ziegenhals meeting and most of the other active communist party politicians had either fled abroad or else been arrested.  The Communist Party structure was shattered.   Kippenberger took on and preserved much of its paramilitary apparatus under conditions of enhanced secrecy and certain important tasks were accomplished, but the Gestapo nevertheless succeeded in infiltrating his information and communications structures.

Kippenberger, operating for some purposes under the code name "Leo", was feverishly sought by the Gestapo during 1933 and 1934.   Meanwhile, despite having to operate underground or, increasingly, out of Paris, the Communist Party of Germany had lost none of its appetite for internal feuding.   The arrest of Ernst Thälmann on 3 March 1933 had left a vacuum at the top of the party.   To the extent that the quasi-military apparatus under Kippenberger remained effective, it supported the opponents of Walter Ulbricht and Wilhelm Pieck in the increasingly polarised leadership struggle that ensued.

The Bülowplatz Trial

In mid-March 1933, the Berlin police arrested Max Thunert, one of the lookouts in the murders of Captains Anlauf and Lenck. Within days, fifteen other conspirators were in police custody. On 14 September 1933, Berlin newspapers reported that all fifteen had confessed to their roles in the murders. Arrest warrants were issued for ten other conspirators who had fled, including Mielke, Ziemer, Ulbricht, Kippenberger, and Neumann.

In response to claims that the confessions were obtained under torture by the Nazi Gestapo, John Koehler wrote, "However, all suspects were in the custody of the regular Berlin city criminal investigation bureau, most of whose detectives were SPD members. Some of the suspects had been nabbed by Nazi SA men and probably beaten before they were turned over to police. In the 1993 trial of Mielke, the court gave the defense the benefit of the doubt and threw out a number of suspect confessions."

On 19 June 1934, the 15 conspirators were convicted of first degree murder. The three deemed most culpable, Michael Klause, Max Matern, and Friedrich Bröde were sentenced to death. Their co-defendants received sentences ranging from nine months to fifteen years incarceration at hard labor. Klause's sentence was commuted to life in prison based upon his cooperation. Bröde hanged himself in his cell. As a result, only Matern was left to be executed by beheading on 22 May 1935.

The Great Purge
In the context of increasingly shrill attacks on him from Ulbricht, Pieck and their supporters, on 12 February 1935 the party politburo set up a commission of enquiry into Hans Kippenberger.   In October 1935 a party congress was held, under somewhat bizarre conditions, at Brussels:   Ulbricht and his allies took over the party leadership.   The resignation of two of Thälmann's old lieutenants, Hermann Schubert and Fritz Schulte left Kippenberger unambiguously on the losing side.  In Walter Ulbricht he had acquired a powerful and uncompromising enemy at the top of the party.  Ulbricht enjoyed the backing of Moscow.   Kippenberger lost his position on the party Central Committee and the quasi-military underground operation he had directed was dissolved.   He was ordered to be relocated from Paris to Moscow where he was provided with factory work. Sources are silent over whether, on moving to Moscow, he ever met up with his former wife, Thea, and their two daughters, Margot and Jeanette, who had emigrated there in July 1933, since when Thea had been working as a teacher in the Soviet capital.

Death
On 5 November 1935, as the scope of Joseph Stalin's Great Purge accelerated, Hans Kippenberger and his girlfriend Christina Kerff (born Chrisina Lenderoth) were brutally beaten and arrested at Moscow's Soyuznaya Hotel (across the road from the Hotel Lux). 

In a secret trial by the NKVD, Kippenberger was declared guilty of "espionage and participation in a counter-revolutionary terrorist organisation". Hans Kippenberger was shot, once, in the back of the head, on 3 October 1937.

Personal life
Hans Kippenberger married Thea Niemand, from Hamburg, in 1923.   Their daughters were born in 1924 and 1928.   The marriage ended in divorce in 1930. After a raid on their Berlin apartment, Thea hastily took the children to a safe location in the countryside, from where they escaped via Czechoslovakia.   
Thea arrived in Moscow with their daughters in July 1933, six months after the Nazi seizure of power in Germany.   The standard of their Moscow accommodation, shared with Thea Kippenberger's friend Thea Beling and a large number of other people, came as a shock to the children. In February 1938 Thea, who by this time worked as a teacher, was arrested.   A special NKVD tribunal sentenced her to a lengthy term in the Gulag. During 1939, Thea Kippenberger died in a concentration camp in Siberia.

Rehabilitation
Two decades later, following a change in the political wind direction, Hans and Thea Kippenberger were posthumously rehabilitated by a Moscow tribunal on 30 September 1957.   However, both their deaths and their subsequent rehabilitations remained officially undisclosed by the ruling party in what had, by this time, become the Soviet sponsored German Democratic Republic (East Germany).

The orphans
One afternoon in November 1937 two secret policemen turned up at their school in Moscow and removed Margot and Jeanette Kippenberger from their lessons. Early the next year, aged 14, Margot wrote a desperate letter to one of her mother's friends asking what had happened to her mother.   There was no reply. It would be another 22 years before she would learn of her parents' fates. The children were taken to Chistopol in Tatarstan and placed in an orphanage for "homeless street children" which at this time was receiving more and more of the children of "enemies of the people".

The older daughter, Margot Kippenberger, was transferred to a labour camp in Vologodskaya, condemned in 1942 to a lifelong term of forced labour.   She was given work in forestry, tasked with collecting the sawdust caused by the felling of trees. There was one day off work each month which was used for delousing. Later she was denounced and subjected to six months of intensive interrogation. Nevertheless, she survived.  Her situation eased after the end of the war, formally in May 1945, and she married Igor Tschnernavin, a Soviet citizen in 1948.

After her parents' rehabilitation Margot Kippenberger was able to leave the Soviet Union with her five children, arriving in the German Democratic Republic (East Germany) in May 1958.   Their marriage never having been officially recognised (because Margot was foreign) Igor was not permitted to accompany them, but following a personal appeal to Nikita Khrushchev he joined them in 1960. The family nevertheless felt themselves treated as outsiders, and while Margot built her life in the new country, Igor soon returned to the Soviet Union, where he died in 1984. Although Margot had been informed of her parents' fates, she was under firm instructions to keep the information to herself.   Her insistence on discussing the matter led to constant tensions with the authorities.   Her indignant letter sent in 1979 to the national newspaper, Neues Deutschland, on the centenary of Stalin's birth, was naturally never published. She remained under close Stasi surveillance till March 1981 when she was permitted to relocate to West Berlin, where she lived in a small apartment, supported by a small pension provided to survivors of Nazi persecution.   There was no pension in respect of her time in the Soviet Union.

There is less information in the public domain concerning the younger daughter.   After they had been taken away from their parents at the end of 1937 Jeanette had learned Russian much more quickly than Margot, which may have indicated a particular talent for languages.   Jeanette Kippenberger worked for the government news service in East Berlin between 1956 and 1973 as a typist. specialising in Russian language work.   She was given a new job, in September 1973, as a translator with the Intertext, the ruling party's translation bureau.   She was able to relocate to West Germany on 14 July 1978.

Margot and Jeannette Kippenberger died respectively in 2005 and 2016.  Both their bodies are buried in the Sankt-Matthäus-Kirchhof ("Old St. Matthew's Churchyard") in Berlin's Schöneberg quarter.   It was noted in at the end of 2017 that their graves were not yet marked by any grave stone.

References

GRU officers
Politicians from Leipzig
Communist Party of Germany politicians
Independent Social Democratic Party politicians
Members of the Hamburg Parliament
Members of the Reichstag of the Weimar Republic
Communists in the German Resistance
Refugees from Nazi Germany in the Soviet Union
Great Purge victims from Germany
People executed by the Soviet Union
German spies for the Soviet Union
Murders of Paul Anlauf and Franz Lenck
1898 births
1937 deaths